Hemdale Film Corporation, known as Hemdale Communications after 1992, was an independent American-British film production company and distributor. The company was founded in London in 1967 as the Hemdale Company by actor David Hemmings and John Daly, naming the company from a combination of their surnames. The company produced numerous acclaimed films, often in conjunction with companies such as TriStar and Orion Pictures, including Platoon (1986) and The Last Emperor (1987), back-to-back winners of the Academy Award for Best Picture.

History 
Hemdale began as an investment company to cut the high personal taxes on British actors. Eventually, the company went public as Hemdale Ltd. and began diversifying. Hemdale partnered with Patrick Meehan of Worldwide Artists, who once managed the band Black Sabbath, invested in feature films, financed stage productions such as Grease, and became involved in boxing promotions such as The Rumble in the Jungle match between George Foreman and Muhammed Ali. John Daly was Hemdale's chairman and president. David Hemmings left the company in 1971, and Daly purchased his stock. Hemdale also distributed cable TV to hotels, which, in 1974, was its major source of revenue.

After producing and distributing British films throughout the 1970s, Hemdale relocated to Hollywood in 1980 and focused extensively on movie-making. A distribution agreement was made with Orion Pictures. In 1981 Derek Gibson joined the company as executive vice president and head of production. Daly and Gibson were then credited together as executive producers on all Hemdale films.

In 1983, Hemdale shuttered its Hemdale Leisure Corporation division, and Hemdale Film Corporation was created as a division that covered all separate production and distributing division companies, Hemdale Film Productions, and Hemdale Film Sales, and they would restructure their own debt, including their own management team, and the UK superstructure was Hemdale Holdings, which arranged the coin support for their American operation.

Among Hemdale's best known films are The Terminator, The Return of the Living Dead, Hoosiers, Salvador, River's Edge, Platoon, and The Last Emperor; the latter two were back-to-back recipients of the Academy Award for Best Picture. Hemdale produced and or financed over 80 films during this period. In 1985, Hemdale Film Corporation decided to venture into film distribution, which would be headed by 20th Century Fox executive Peter S. Myers, and decided to continue their relations with Orion Pictures, which included their releases of Hoosiers and At Close Range, and the new distribution range had 12 films planned per year.

In 1986, Salvador was the first major film released by Hemdale Distribution in the United States. Howling II: Your Sister Is a Werewolf had received a regional release in December 1985. On May 14, 1986, the company bought out the distribution rights of the five British motion pictures, which came from the film production studio and international sales representative Film Four International, in order to serve financing for the film The Last Emperor for $21.5 million. On June 25, 1986, the company received a pre-buy on eight Australian movie titles for $10–12 million, and decided to expand the company's worldwide portfolio and represent global distribution and production activity. The company had reached an agreement with Vestron Video on June 25, 1986, in order to bring the entire company's output to the North American home video market, with such releases like Made in U.S.A. and Platoon, after such successes with the agreement, like Hoosiers and At Close Range. On September 10, 1986, Hemdale inked an agreement with HBO/Cannon Video whereas they would increase their profile in order to gave access to ten to fifteen theatricals Hemdale would be producing, and decided to include all pay television rights of nearly all Hemdale features, and the home video rights of the films were assigned as $40 million, and titles Hemdale donated like A Breed Apart, Howling II: Your Sister is a Werewolf and Return of the Living Dead, were already assigned via Hemdale to HBO/Cannon.

On December 10, 1986, Hemdale Film Corporation filed a lawsuit against producer Interlink Film Distribution Corp, which was formed by the Greenberg brothers (Richard M. Greenberg and A. Frederick Goldberg) for failing to meet marketing and other contractual obligations in support of nine Hemdale titles, which claimed by agreement in mid-1983 that the companies had inked an agreement. On March 18, 1987, Hemdale Film Corporation was to be acquired by Computer Memories, a firm that invested $29 million and decided to establish it as a public company, and in exchange for the 80% stock of the common company, and Hemdale would receive 37.6 million shares of newly issued common stock that was donated for the organization and John Daly, the company's founder had to sell 20% in order to raise $30 million that was donated by Computer Memories, and Derek Gibson would become CEO of the newly expanded company, but the deal fell through. On March 18, 1987, Hemdale Film Corporation teamed up with Nelson Entertainment, through its Embassy Home Entertainment subsidiary in order to gain domestic video rights to 10 films, which will be handled by Nelson, while Hemdale retained all other rights, and the budget for the films and in a co-financing agreement, and the 10 Hemdale/Nelson films would gain $6 million, whereas Nelson went into the $25–30 million range, judging by current market conditions of its titles.

In 1987, Vestron Video sued HBO Video over the video rights to Platoon and Hoosiers. Hemdale initially licensed the two films to Vestron until the two parties had disagreements and, citing breach of contract, Hemdale turned around and sold the video rights to HBO. On June 3, 1987, Nelson Entertainment decided to be challenged to the Vestron/HBO lawsuit, and the company filed for Nelson, because Nelson decided to pick up an identical set of 12 films under almost identical terms as the arrangement Vestron was trying to enforce, and the deal decided to add another film to the mix, High Tide, that brought advance for $3 million. The lawsuit ultimately delayed the release of Platoon for three months until a settlement was reached wherein HBO would hold the video rights to the disputed films for six months, at the end of which the rights reverted to Vestron.

In 1991, Hemdale brought in home video executive Eric Parkinson to establish the company's own in-house home video distribution. The new video operation was an immediate success, buoyed in large part to Parkinson's launch of the division with the original Terminator feature the same week that the James Cameron-directed sequel, T2, was released to theatres. Hemdale Home Video quickly became the cash locomotive for all operations, and in April of the following year, Hemdale Video was merged with a NASDAQ company called Peerless Productions to form a new entity, Hemdale Communications, Inc. (NASDAQ).  In an attempt to attach revenues from the successful home video venture operated by Parkinson, former creditors of Hemdale Films alleged that some of the distribution rights licensed by Hemdale Communications, Inc. were done so at unfair market prices. None of these claims prevailed. The video division's success motivated the promotion of Eric Parkinson within the Hemdale family, and ultimately to C.E.O. The Hemdale video division created a collection of video titles released by Hemdale Home Video in the US; its first No.  1 hit title was the home video reissue of the original Terminator in 1991, via a distribution deal it signed with the old Hemdale company, then renamed NSB Film Corporation, to release some films from the latter's 150-title library. In 1992, Hemdale Pictures was also merged into the NASDAQ public company, Hemdale Communications, Inc. In 1995, the video rights to some of Hemdale's higher-profile titles were licensed to LIVE Entertainment (now Lionsgate).

In 1992, NSB sued Daly and Gibson for allegedly unfairly selling some Hemdale properties to the public company managed by Parkinson and Crédit Lyonnais Bank Nederland for breach of contract, racketeering, fraud, equitable subordination and contributing to its bankruptcy. The NSB claims against Daly and Gibson were dismissed. The next year, Crédit Lyonnais filed a lawsuit against NSB, resulting in the bank foreclosing on both NSB and its Hemdale library and forcing NSB to sever ties with Hemdale Home Video and Hemdale Communications to release some of its titles. In 1994, NSB and Crédit Lyonnais settled their year-old ligation.

In March 1995, Daly and Gibson left the company, to be succeeded in their positions by Eric Parkinson as C.E.O. handling all Hemdale related activities and affiliates, including Hemdale Holdings, Hemdale Pictures and Hemdale Film Sales. That November, the company was reorganized as a preplanned step for a general shut-down of operations.

Aftermath 
After the studio closed, the Hemdale library was then incorporated into Consortium de Réalisation, a French holding company set up by Crédit Lyonnais to handle the rights to titles acquired by Credit Lyonnais Bank (this was otherwise known as the Epic library).  In 1999, the library was incorporated into the Orion Pictures output now owned by Metro-Goldwyn-Mayer via PolyGram Filmed Entertainment, after MGM acquired the Consortium de Réalisation/“Epic” library from PolyGram (ironically, Orion was the theatrical distributor for a number of Hemdale's films). One significant exception is The Last Emperor, a Hemdale production whose rights are now held by its producer, Jeremy Thomas. Hemdale licensed each of the US media rights to different companies; for example, Columbia Pictures handled US theatrical distribution only. Most of the foreign productions Hemdale distributed have subsequently returned to their original owners (such as Little Nemo: Adventures in Slumberland, which producer Tokyo Movie Shinsha now controls worldwide). In the late '80s and early '90s, the television rights to the Hemdale library lay with Carolco Pictures.

The company's last new credit was the Virgin Games video game adaptation The Terminator, which showed up on the game's start up screen as Hemdale's The Terminator.

Films

Notes

References 

1967 establishments in England
1995 disestablishments in California
American independent film studios
Companies that filed for Chapter 11 bankruptcy in 1995
Film distributors of the United Kingdom
Film distributors of the United States
Film production companies of the United Kingdom
Film production companies of the United States
Mass media companies disestablished in 1995
Mass media companies established in 1967